Zahara de la Sierra is a municipality in the province of Cádiz in the hills of Andalusia, southern Spain. It is perched on a mountain, overlooking a valley and a man-made lake formed by the dam that must be driven over to access the town. It is considered to be one of the pueblos blancos or "white towns" because the overwhelming majority of the buildings are white.

The town was originally a Moorish outpost, overlooking the valley. Due to its position between Ronda and Seville, it was a perfect site for a castle to be built to serve as a fortress in case of attack. The remains of the Moorish castle still exist. It was ruled by Arabs until 1407. It was recaptured by the Emirate of Granada in 1481. This capture gave a pretext to Castile's war against Granada. It was finally captured by Castilian troops under command of Rodrigo Ponce de León, Duke of Cádiz in 1483.

The Garganta Verde canyon is located nearby.

References

External links 

 Tourist Information for Sierra de Grazalema in English

Municipalities of the Province of Cádiz